McFadden may refer to:

People

Fictional characters
 "Casper McFadden" (otherwise known as "Casper the Friendly Ghost")
 "McFadden" is also a name of a Prison Break character, James Whistler
 "Bart McFadden" is a character, known as a fictional head coach of the Atlanta Falcons in the book by Tim Green, Football Genius

Other
 McFadden Act, American law
 McFadden and Whitehead, American songwriting, production, and recording duo
 Macfadden Publishing
 Macfadden's Fiction Lover's Magazine, short-lived successor name for Metropolitan magazine in 1920s

See also
 McFadyen (disambiguation)
 MacFadyen